Philip Delves Broughton  is a British journalist and author known for his business journalism, such as in his books Ahead of the Curve (2008), and The Art of the Sale (2012).

Biography
He has written four books. He was born in Dacca, Bangladesh, where his father worked as a Church of England missionary and his mother spent four years after leaving Burma with her family following the 1962 Burmese coup d'état. He grew up in England, received his BA in Classics from Oxford University and his MBA from Harvard Business School.

Journalism
From 1994 to 2004 he was a newspaper journalist. From 1998 to 2002, he was New York City correspondent for The Daily Telegraph of London, and covered the 9/11 attacks and their aftermath. From 2002 to 2004 he was the Telegraph's Paris Bureau Chief.  He left daily journalism in 2004 to go to Harvard.

Subsequently he has been a columnist for The Financial Times and The Evening Standard and writes regularly for The Wall Street Journal, The Spectator and The Oldie

Books
Ahead of the Curve 2008.

What They Teach You At Harvard Business School 2008.
The Art of the Sale 2012.
Charlie Whistler's Omnium Gatherum 2016 (Children's Book).
How to Think Like an Entrepreneur 2016

References

External links
Personal site – https://philipdelvesbroughton.com
Twitter – https://twitter.com/delvesbroughton

British journalists
Harvard Business School alumni
Alumni of the University of Oxford
Living people
Year of birth missing (living people)